Merosargus elatus is a species of soldier fly in the family Stratiomyidae.

Distribution
Mexico, Costa Rica, Panama.

References

Stratiomyidae
Insects described in 1932
Diptera of North America
Taxa named by Charles Howard Curran